This is a list of seasons completed by the Northwestern Wildcats football team of the National Collegiate Athletic Association (NCAA) Division I Football Bowl Subdivision (FBS). Since the team's creation in 1882, the Wildcats have participated in more than 1,100 officially sanctioned games, including 9 bowl games.

Northwestern originally competed as a football independent. As one of the founding members, Northwestern joined the Big Ten conference, then known as the Western Conference, in 1896, where it has been a member ever since. 

The Wildcats have experienced futility for much of its existence. The team has several winless seasons, including setting an NCAA Division I record for consecutive losses when it lost 34 straight games from 1979 to 1982. The Wildcats went 64 years without winning a bowl game after the 1949 Rose Bowl. Northwestern has also experienced success, winning eight conference titles.

Seasons

References

Northwestern

Northwestern Wildcats football seasons